The 2013 IAM Cycling season was the first season of the  team, which was founded in 2012. The team competed on the UCI Professional Continental level. They began the season on 27 January at the Grand Prix d'Ouverture La Marseillaise, and finished in October at the 2013 Giro di Lombardia. The team participated in UCI Continental Circuits and UCI World Tour events when given a wildcard invitation.

New team
The paperwork for the foundation of the IAM Cycling SA company was filed in Geneva on 19 April 2012. The team was founded by Swiss businessman Michel Thiétaz and sponsored by his company IAM Independent Asset Management for three seasons. The team budget for their premiere season was 7 million euros. In August 2012 the team announced a high-profile signing, with 2010 Giro d'Italia stage winner and 2012 Tour of Utah winner Johann Tschopp of  joining the team.  rider Mickaël Buffaz was rumoured to sign with the team, but did not receive a contract. IAM Cycling joined the Mouvement pour un cyclisme crédible in October 2012.

The team was officially launched 14 January 2013 in Geneva, with the goal for the season being invitations to Paris–Nice, Paris–Roubaix, the Critérium du Dauphiné and the Ardennes classics. The following week IAM Cycling was selected as a wild-card entry by race organisers Amaury Sport Organisation for the 2013 Paris–Nice race, but not for the 2013 Critérium du Dauphiné.

Team roster
Ages as of January 1, 2013

Riders' 2012 teams

Staff
Former French champion and Crédit Agricole directeur sportif Serge Beucherie was hired as team manager. Former Swiss rider Marcello Albasini, former French rider Eddy Seigneur and former Finnish rider Kjell Carlström were hired as directeur sportifs along with former Swiss rider Rubens Bertogliati.

One-day races

The team's first ever race was the Grand Prix d'Ouverture La Marseillaise on 27 January, where Wyss and Brändle both finished with the bunch.
At the 1.2 race Tour de Berne IAM had five people in the top ten, with Marcel Wyss winning the race 13 seconds ahead of Sébastien Reichenbach and 15 seconds ahead of Rémi Cusin and Matthias Brändle. Reto Hollenstein finished sixth.

Stage races
The 2013 Tour of Qatar was the teams' first ever stage race. Martin Elmiger finished second on the first stage, but lost his place in the general classification the next day. Heinrich Haussler finished fifth on stage three and ninth on stage five. The team did well at the Tour Méditerranéen in February, with Matteo Pelucchi finishing second on the first stage, letting him ride in the white jersey on stage two as the leader of the young rider classification. On the final stage Löfkvist lost the points jersey to Jürgen Roelandts of  but took over the lead and won the overall classification.

At the 2013 Tour of Oman Kristof Goddaert finished eight on the stage one bunch sprint, but was only 11th overall due to intermediate sprints. On stage two Goddaert finished in 63rd place and lost his position in the general classification. Martin Elmiger took part in a late breakaway which led to him finishing third, helping him into third place overall and seventh in the points classification. Marco Bandiera finished seventh, which placed him in ninth place overall. After stage two Jonathan Fumeaux was eighth in the young rider classification, and IAM was second in the team classification. Elmiger finished 16th on stage three, dropping to fourth overall while IAM fell to third place in the teams classification and Fumeaux climbed to sixth in the young rider classification. On stage four Johann Tschopp crossed the finish line in Jebel Akhdar in seventh place, which led to an eighth place in the overall standings and four points in the points classification. Fumeaux dropped one position in the young rider classification and IAM dropped to fourth place in the teams competition. On stage five Tschopp again finished seventh, elevating him into sixth position overall six seconds in front of Vincenzo Nibali. Fumeaux finished 76th on the stage and dropped to ninth place in the youth classification. On the sixth and final stage Tschopp finished with the bunch, thus retaining his sixth place in the general classification. Elmiger was 15th overall. Elmiger and´Tschopp finished 17th and 20th respectively in the overall points classification, with Marco Bandiera and Goddaert also scoring some points.

Grand Tours
As an UCI Professional Continental team IAM Cycling was not automatically granted the right to participate in any of the three Grand Tours. The team was considered by race organiser Amaury Sport Organisation for a Tour de France invitation, but ultimately was not invited. They did not receive an invitation to the Giro d'Italia or the Vuelta a España either, but were invited to Milan–San Remo and Il Lombardia by Giro race organizer RCS Sport instead.

Season victories

National championships

1st  National Time Trial Championships, Matthias Brändle
1st  National Time Trial Championships, Gustav Larsson
1st  National Road Race Championships, Aleksejs Saramotins

References

2013 road cycling season by team
IAM Cycling
2013 in Swiss sport